Joe or Joseph Jackson may refer to:

Entertainment 
 Joe Jackson Sr. (1873–1942), Austrian clown
 Joseph Jackson (screenwriter) (1894–1932), American screenwriter of The Barker
 Joe Jackson (manager) (1928–2018), father and manager of Michael Jackson and The Jacksons
 Joe Jackson (musician) (born 1954), British singer-songwriter
 "Little Joe" Jackson, fictional character in the Broadway show and film Cabin in the Sky

Politics
Joseph Jackson (Bristol MP), 17th century English politician
Joseph Devonsher Jackson (1783–1857), Irish Conservative MP in the United Kingdom Parliament
Joseph Jackson (American politician) (1793–1888), American politician in the Michigan House of Representatives
Joseph Webber Jackson (1796–1854), United States Representative from Georgia
Joseph Jackson (Canadian politician) (1831–1908), Canadian Member of Parliament for Norfolk South, 1882–1887
Joseph Jackson (Australian politician) (1874–1956), Member of New South Wales Legislative Assembly for Sydney, 1922–1927
Joseph Cooksey Jackson (1879–1938), British Member of Parliament for Heywood and Radcliffe, 1931–1935
Joseph H. Jackson (New York politician), American lawyer and politician from New York

Sports

American football
Joey Jackson (born 1950), American football player
Joe Jackson (linebacker, born 1953), American football player
Joe Jackson (linebacker, born 1962), American football player
Joe Jackson (linebacker, born 1976), American football player
Joe Jackson (offensive lineman) (born 1979), American football player
Joe Jackson (defensive end) (born 1996), American football player

Other sports
Shoeless Joe Jackson (1887–1951), American baseball player in Black Sox Scandal
Joe S. Jackson (1871–1936), American sportswriter
Joseph Jackson (sport shooter) (1880–1960), American Olympic champion sport shooter
Joseph Jackson (athlete) (1904–1981), French Olympic sprinter
Neil Jackson (swimmer) (Joseph Neil Jackson, born 1946), British Olympic swimmer
Joe Jackson (basketball) (born 1992), American basketball player
Joe Jackson (footballer) (born 1993), English footballer

Other people
 Joseph Jackson (typefounder) (1733–1792), British typefounder
 Joseph A. Jackson (1861–1940), American architect
 Joseph Raymond Jackson (1880–1969), judge of the U.S. Court of Customs and Patent Appeals
 Joseph H. Jackson (1900–1990), American Baptist pastor and civil rights campaigner
 Joe Jackson (police officer) (1902–1975), Assistant Commissioner of the London Metropolitan Police, 1953–1963
 Joe M. Jackson (1923–2019), United States Air Force officer and Medal of Honor recipient in the Vietnam War
 Joe Jackson (writer) (born 1955) , American author

See also
Jo Jackson (disambiguation)